The Russian submarine B-871 Alrosa is a diesel-electric  that joined the Soviet Navy in 1990 and was active with the Russian Navy's Black Sea Fleet. B-871 Alrosa was laid down on 17 May 1988 at the Gorky shipyard. The submarine was launched on 10 September 1989 and commissioned on 1 December 1990. In 1991, during the dissolution of the Soviet Union, the crew of the boat swore allegiance to Ukraine. Though in Ukrainian service, the submarine saw limited duty due to a lack of parts. The vessel returned to Russian service in 1997 as part of an agreement between the two nations.

Design and description
Instead of a propeller, Alrosa uses a pump jet propulsion system. , it is unclear if this is still used or if the submarine has been converted to use a more conventional propulsion system.

Construction and career

Construction and Soviet service
The boat was laid down on 17 May 1988 at the shipyard in Gorky with the yard number 607. Initially the boat was of the 877V design, which included the provision of a water jet nozzle instead of a propeller. On 18 May 1989 the boat crew was formed under the command of Captain 3rd Rank A. Yu Romanov. On 10 September 1989 the submarine was launched. In November of the same year, the submarine using inland waterways, crossed the Black Sea and on 1 December 1990, the naval ensign was raised. On 30 December 1990, B-871 became part of the 153rd Brigade of the Red submarines 14th submarine division of Black Sea Fleet based at the South Bay (Sevastopol).

Ukrainian service
From December 1991 to March 1992, the boat fulfilled its tasks of combat service. On 13 March 1992 the boats' crew swore allegiance to Ukraine and captured the boat. Beginning in 1992, B-871 was limited to dockside duty due to the lack of batteries.

In 1995 the submarine joined the 155th brigade of submarines. On 22 May 1996 after installing batteries, the boat joined the forces of permanent readiness. In August and September of the same year B-871 fulfilled the tasks of combat service with a rating of "excellent". Returning from deployment, she arrived in Novorossiysk, where she participated in the celebration of Navy Day.

Russian service and later career
In accordance with the Russian-Ukrainian agreement of 1997, the boat became part of the Russian Black Sea Fleet. On 19 September of the same year at the initiative of the Russian diamond mining company Alrosa and a number of veterans of the Navy signed an agreement on patronage over the boat stock company "Alrosa".
The sponsorship both upholds the Russian Navy and provides youths from Yakutia (where diamond mines are located) a military alternative to crime, drugs and alcoholism.

From August 1998 to April 1999 the vessel was held in Sevastopol for repairs. In January 2004, given the name of the B-871 Alrosa.
This makes it "the world’s only combat submarine named after a company".

During August 2008 took part in fights off the Abkhazian coast and landed to Suhumi shore on pier.

On 5 August 2009, the submarine conducted deep tests after dock repairs. On 21 November, while training in the Black Sea there was a failure of the propulsion system. The propulsion system failure may have included an "engine fire" requiring Alrosa in 2009 having to go to the Kronshtadt port near St. Petersburg for extensive repairs. On 23 November Alrosa was towed to the Novorossiysk naval base.

From May to June 2011, Alrosa, together with support vessels, participated in an international exercises for rescue forces, called "Bold Monarch", held off the coast of Spain. After the exercise, in July, the boat made the transition to the Baltic Sea, where stood for scheduled maintenance in Kronstadt. In September 2012, she returned to Sevastopol after the scheduled maintenance. The transition from the Baltic to the Black Sea took a little more than a month. In June 2011 she took part in a NATO submarine rescue exercise, 'Bold Monarch 2011,' the first Russian submarine to do so.

On 12 May 2013, Alrosa, together with the Ukrainian submarine  were present at the celebration of the 230th anniversary of the Black Sea Fleet in Sevastopol.
After the Russian annexation of Crimea in 2014, the Alrosa crew serviced the captured Zaporizhzhia, until then, the only Ukrainian submarine and Alrosa also served to train half of its formerly Ukrainian crew, who had chosen to join the Russian Navy.

In 2018, it was reported that the submarine would be transferred to the Baltic Fleet. However, such a transfer had not occurred as of 2020 though the matter was reported as still under consideration in 2021. The submarine was undergoing maintenance as of 2021. It is now the only original Kilo-class boat (Project 877) remaining with the Black Sea Fleet with all other traditional Kilos in the fleet having been replaced by the more modern "Improved Kilo" (Project 636.3) variant. The previously announced transfer of Alrosa diesel-electric submarine from the Black Sea Fleet to the Baltic Fleet is no longer relevant, it was decided to leave the submarine in the Black Sea Fleet. The submarine underwent a major overhaul with modernization, having received the opportunity to use Kalibr/Club cruise missiles. After passing the necessary post-repair tests, she was introduced into the Black Sea Fleet submarine brigade based in Sevastopol in June 2022.

References

1990 ships
Submarines of Russia
Kilo-class submarines
Attack submarines
Ships built by Krasnoye Sormovo Factory No. 112